The Bisbee Woman's Club Clubhouse in Bisbee, Arizona was built in 1902.  It was listed on the National Register of Historic Places in 1985.

It was designed by architect Frederick C. Hurst and is a one-story frame bungalow/craftsman style house.

References

Cultural infrastructure completed in 1902
Buildings and structures in Cochise County, Arizona
Women's club buildings in Arizona
Women in Arizona
Clubhouses on the National Register of Historic Places in Arizona
1902 establishments in Arizona Territory
National Register of Historic Places in Cochise County, Arizona
Bisbee, Arizona